Jeunesse sportive de Kabylie is an Algerian professional football club based in Tizi Ouzou, Tizi Ouzou Province. The club was formed in 1946 as Jeunesse Sportive de Kabylie, and played their first competitive match in 1946, when they entered the 1946–47 Ligue d'Alger Troisième Division. After changing his name twice from 1974 to 1977 Jamiat Sari' Kawkabi and from 1977 to 1989 Jeunesse Électronique de Tizi-Ouzou The club was renamed his old name Jeunesse sportive de Kabylie in 1989.

The club has won a total of 28 major trophies, including the national championship a record 14 times also won the Algerian Cup 5 times, the Algerian League Cup once, the Algerian Super Cup 1 time, the CAF Champions League 2 times, the now-defunct African Cup Winners' Cup 1 time, and the now-defunct CAF Cup 3 times. The club has also never been out of the top two divisions of Algerian football since entering the Football League.

This is a list of the seasons played by JS Kabylie from 1962 when the club first entered a league competition to the most recent seasons. The club's achievements in all major national and international competitions as well as the top scorers are listed. Top scorers in bold were also top scorers of Ligue 1. The list is separated into three parts, coinciding with the three major episodes of Algerian football:

History 
After independence, JS Kabylie became the best Algerian team, and among the best clubs in Africa where he has six titles, the best coach over the club is the Polish Stefan Żywotko, who won ten titles, including the African Cup of Champions Clubs twice in 14 years.

Before independence

Below, the JS Kabylie season-by-season record before independence in the French Algeria period :

After independence
Below, the JS Kabylie season-by-season record after independence of Algeria :

Key 

Key to league record:
P = Played
W = Games won
D = Games drawn
L = Games lost
GF = Goals for
GA = Goals against
Pts = Points
Pos = Final position

Key to divisions:
1 = Ligue 1
2 = Ligue 2

Key to rounds:
DNE = Did not enter
Grp = Group stage
R1 = First Round
R2 = Second Round
R32 = Round of 32

R16 = Round of 16
QF = Quarter-finals
SF = Semi-finals
RU = Runners-up
W = Winners

Division shown in bold to indicate a change in division.
Top scorers shown in bold are players who were also top scorers in their division that season.

List of leading goalscorers
Bold Still playing competitive football in JS Kabylie.

Position key:
GK – Goalkeeper;
DF – Defender;
MF – Midfielder;
FW – Forward

1 Includes the Super Cup.
2 Includes the Confederation Cup and Champions League.
3 Includes the UAFA Club Cup.

Notes

References 

 

Seasons
JS Kabylie